Batalin (Баталин in Russian) is a surname. Notable people with the surname include:

 Alexander Theodorowicz Batalin (1847–1896), Russian botanist
 Igor Batalin, Russian physicist, see Batalin–Vilkovisky formalism

See also
Batali (disambiguation)

Russian-language surnames